Diino is a cloud storage provider, offering online backup data storage and file sharing. The company, Diino Systems AB, was founded 2004 and is based Stockholm, Sweden, with sales offices in Atlanta, London and Mexico City. Its owners include Swisscom.

The service runs on Windows, Mac, Linux, Android, iPhone and iPad platforms, and allows users to create simple automated rules for protecting data by moving it into a Diino account. The service is offered directly to consumers and SME:s, but also indirectly with a white label solution via partners such as telecom operators, ISP:s and large consumer brands.

Diinos current major shareholders has decided to wind down their ownership and funding of Diino. They have been in negotiations with a number of potential stakeholders and the service is now taken over by Swiss Picture Bank with the intention to continue to run the service as before but now via the new Swedish company, New Diino AB.

See also
Comparison of online backup services

References 

 Official site - About Diino
 BackupReview.info Interviews Jan Nilsson, CEO of Diino Online Backup

External links
 Official site

Online backup services
File hosting
Cloud storage
File hosting for Linux
File hosting for macOS
File hosting for Windows